Hupodonta is a genus of moths of the family Notodontidae erected by Arthur Gardiner Butler in 1877.

Species
Hupodonta corticalis Butler, 1877
Hupodonta imbrifera Schintlmeister, 1994
Hupodonta lignea Matsumura, 1919
Hupodonta pulcherrima (Moore, [1866])
Hupodonta uniformis Schintlmeister, 2002

References

Notodontidae